Nick Philip (born in 1968 in London) is a graphic and multi-media artist and clothing designer based in San Francisco, California.

Career
As a teenager in London, Philip was a cut-and-paste artist active in the city's freestyle bicycle/skateboard subculture. In 1988, after moving to the United States, he founded Anarchic Adjustment, a "streetweare" clothing line geared to appeal to freestyle/skate, rave and techno consumers. Under the Anarchic label, Philip partnered with Alan Brown and Charles Uzzell Edwards. Philip created early Bay Area rave fliers.<ref name="EBE">Darren Keast: Computer World. East Bay Express, August 29, 2001</ref>

He became a founding contributor of Wired Magazine in 1993

Phiilip was co-founder of the multimedia studio SFX in San Francisco from 1993-94. He also designed a number of CD covers for the ambient music label Silent Records during this time.

In the mid-1990s Philip worked on the film What Dreams May Come; in the movie's 1998 release, Philip is credited with "painted world visual effects: Lunarfish" (Lunarfish being a San-Francisco-based special-effects and CGI company). In 1997 Philip released Radical Beauty on Om Records, a combination of audio CD and computer CD-ROM that combines music, graphic art, computer animation, and an interactive digital mixing capacity. It won the Best Digital Contents Award at San Francisco Multimedia Summit. The music on the audio CD was provided by a range of techno, hip-hop, and ambient artists, including Mixmaster Morris, T-Power and Daniel Pemberton.

Philip created the first video for MTV's electronic music show Amp. He has performed live with ambient music artist Pete Lawrence, founder of the Big Chill Festival.

In 2006 Philip designed surrealistic-imaged T-shirts for The Imaginary Foundation. He has displayed his visual art at the San Francisco multi-media art gallery blasthaus, and he has worked as a videographer, in collaboration with audio artists Sun Electric ("Meccano"), Prana, and Journeyman''.

References

External links
The Imaginary Foundation
1998 interview (Shift magazine, Japan)

1968 births
Living people